Shibu Mitra is an Indian film director and producer. His career spans more than 40 feature films in Bollywood, and his movies were particularly popular in the late 1970s and through out 1980s, the most successful among them being Shankar Dada,  Aakhri Goli, Paanch Qaidi, Ilzaam, Aag Hi Aag, Paap Ki Duniya, Insaaf Main Karoongaa, Maan Gaye Ustaad and Durgaa.

Early life
Shibu was born in a Bengali family to Suresh Chandra and Suruchi Mitra in Kolkata on 25 March 1948. His father was a lawyer, and his mother a school principal. Both of his brothers pursued careers in law, while Shibu's was drawn towards a career in Bollywood, joining the Film and Television Institute of India (FTII Pune).

Career
After graduating from FTII Pune, Shibu worked as an assistant to veteran Basu Chatterjee. He received training in commercial film-making from him and soon went on to direct his first venture Bindiya Aur Bandook, a low-budget movie starring newcomer Kiran Kumar and Asha Sachdev which went on to become a huge blockbuster and was among the biggest hits of 1972, gaining him recognition within the industry.

Shibu Mitra has worked on films which launched a number of Bollywood stars, including Govinda, Chunky Pandey, Neetu Singh (as Heroine), Danny Dengzongpa, Kiran Kumar, and Raza Murad. In recognition of his contribution to the Indian film industry he was awarded the "Star Maker of the Decade" Award at the Eighteenth Filmgoers Award in 1987.

Filmography
 1972: Bindiya Aur Bandook
 1974: Shatranj Ke Mohre
 1974: Khoon Ki Keemat
 1975: Zorro
 1976: Shankar Dada
 1977: Aakhri Goli
 1979: Raakhi Ki Saugandh
 1980: Kaala Pani
 1980: Bambai Ka Maharaja
 1981: Paanch Qaidi
 1981: Maan Gaye Ustaad
 1982: Sumbandh
 1983: Mujhe Vachan Do
 1983: Humse Na Jeeta Koi
 1984: Yadoon Ki Zanjeer
 1984: Raja Aur Rana
 1984: Inteha
 1985: Insaaf Main Karoongaa
 1985: Durgaa
 1985: Maa Kasam
 1986: Ilzaam
 1987: Sitapur Ki Geeta
 1987: Kaun Kitney Pani Mein
 1987: Aag Hi Aag
 1988: Paap Ki Duniya
 1988: Gunahon Ka Faisla
 1989: Paanch Paapi
 1989: Meri Zabaan
 1989: Kasam Vardi Kee
 1989: Aakhri Ghulam
 1990: Badnam
 1990: Aaj Ke Shahenshah
 1990: Naakabandi
 1992: Priya
 1993: Veertaa
 1994: Prem Shakti
 1996: Jagannath
 1998: Zanjeer
 2001: Kasam

References

External links
 

Film directors from Kolkata
Living people
1948 births
Film and Television Institute of India alumni
Hindi-language film directors
20th-century Indian film directors
People from Kolkata